Richfield High School is the only public traditional high school in Richfield, Minnesota, United States. The school serves grades 9-12 for the Richfield Public Schools and have a "vision of equity" statement of "dismantling policies and processes that benefit whiteness and other systems of privilege".

Athletics
Richfield High School is a member of the Tri-Metro Conference in the Minnesota State High School League.

Notable alumni 
 Steve Christoff, NHL player 
 Darby Hendrickson, NHL player 
 Steven Lindgren, Minnesota State Senator from District 37
 Damian Rhodes, NHL player

References

External links

Public high schools in Minnesota
Educational institutions established in 1954
Schools in Hennepin County, Minnesota
Richfield, Minnesota
1954 establishments in Minnesota